Young Figuratives was the title of two exhibitions of new contemporary art by young German painters. This first exhibition was shown under this heading in 2001 in the Carolinen Palais in Munich (Germany). The same exhibition was presented at the Museum Mönchehaus Goslar (Germany) in 2002. Both exhibitions were curated by Martin Leyer-Pritzkow.

New figurative painting 
The artists featured in these exhibitions blurred the historical distinction between abstract and figurative painting. Human figures, landscapes, plants, figures, interior/exterior spaces were combined in non-representational landscapes. All forms of expression, visual languages or art historical quotations were incorporated into their work. Christoph Zuschlag, a German art historian expressed in his text about the Young Figuratives: "...the ideological trench struggles to figuration and abstraction, which divided the art scene in the post-war period into two hostile camps, is now regarded as well as outdated as the picturesque tendencies of the 60s and 70s. This means that the painter today - no longer under constant pressure to justify - especially after the reunification with former East Germany, where painting had its leadership never lost and that a figurative painter is no longer automatically opposing abstraction.  This in turn liberates the young figuratives: freedom of synthesis .... They have the freedom to own, for example, the characteristic of the Informal resolution of the classical principle of form and make it useful for their own paintings, even and especially when they themselves work figurative."[2]

Participating Artists 
 Armin Baumgarten
 Woytek Berowski
 Hans-Jörg Holubitschka
 Peter Lindenberg
 Oliver Lochau
 Bernard Lokai
 Stefan Schwarzmüller
 Benjamin Nachtwey
 Katrin Roeber

Edition Young Figuratives by Mönchehaus Museum 
At the opening of the exhibition in 2002 an offset print edition of nine works by all participating artists entitled "Young Figurative - Mönchehaus Museum of Modern Art 2002" were made available with an edition of 90 copies.[3]

References 
 Gerald Kleffmann, Friends under the umbrella” (Freunde unterm Schirm), Süddeutsche Zeitung, no. 24, p. 39, 2001
 Martin Leyer-Pritzkow, editor : Young Figuratives, (Junge Figurative) with texts among others by Christoph Zuschlag and Robert Ketterer, in German and English, 2001,  [1]
 Christoph Zuschlag: Young Figruative painting, in Young Figuratives, edited by Martin Leyer-Pritzkow, English and German, 2001,   [2] 
 Edition "Young Figuratives" Mönchehaus Museum of Modern and Contemporary Art, 2001 edition of 90 each with nine different leaves. [3]
 Centre Pompidou, Cher Peintre - Peintures figurative depuis l'ultime de Picabia, 2002 [4],
 Schirn Kunsthalle Frankfurt, "Dear Painter, Paint Me ..." (Lieber Maler, male mir) Radical Realism by Picabia, 2003 [5]
 Nicloaus Schafhausen; Exhibition "German painting two thousand and three" Frankfurter Kunstverein, 2003  [6]
 New Düsseldorf School of Painting, editor: Krefeld Art Museums with texts among others by Martin Hentschel, Kerber Verlag, 2003,   [7]

External links 
 Young Figuratives (Junge Figurative) in the German National Library
 Ole Reissmann: wikipedia-annual meeting - the voluntaries run away, Spiegelonline, 2011

German contemporary artists
Figurative art
German painters
Contemporary painters
Living people
Year of birth missing (living people)